Sead Hajrović (born 4 June 1993) is a Bosnian professional footballer who plays for Yverdon-Sport.

Club career

Arsenal
Hajrović officially signed professional terms on 7 July 2011 after signing for Arsenal as a scholar in the summer of 2009, arriving from Grasshopper in his home country.

He went on loan to Barnet and made his debut on 28 January 2012 against Crewe Alexandra, coming on as a substitute. Although his spell with Barnet was hampered somewhat by injury, he made 10 appearances as the Bees avoided relegation from League Two.

In an interview with Mugais Jahangir, the Editor of The Gooner Thoughts, Hajrović talked about his time at Arsenal and Arsene Wenger as his coach, who he describes as 'motivating'.

On 4 December 2012, Hajrović was included in Arsenal's trip to Olympiacos as an unused substitute.

In May 2013, Hajrović was released by Arsenal to look for a different team where he plans to start regularly.

Grasshopper
On 5 August 2013, Hajrović signed a two-year contract with Grasshopper Club Zürich.

Winterthur
On 1 July 2014, Hajrović signed another two-year contract with FC Winterthur after terminating his previous contract with Grasshopper.

International career
Hajrović was part of the Swiss side that won the under-17 World Cup in 2009, before going on to captain the under-18s.

At the start of 2013, Hajrović, after expressing desire to play for Bosnia and Herzegovina, was invited by the Bosnian FA as a special guest for Bosnia's friendly against Slovenia. In May 2013, FIFA allowed Hajrović to switch national teams, after which he elected to play for Bosnia and Herzegovina internationally.

He made his debut for Bosnian U-21 team on 31 May 2013. in a friendly match between Bosnia and Herzegovina U21 and Bosnia and Herzegovina.

Personal life
His parents are Bosniaks from Bijelo Polje, Montenegro, but they relocated to Sarajevo in 1980.  They moved to Switzerland in 1987. His older brother, Izet is also a footballer playing for Dinamo Zagreb.

Hajrović is fluent in German, English and Bosnian.

References

External links
 
 

1993 births
Living people
Swiss men's footballers
Swiss expatriate footballers
Bosniaks of Montenegro
Swiss people of Bosnia and Herzegovina descent
Citizens of Bosnia and Herzegovina through descent
Switzerland youth international footballers
Bosnia and Herzegovina youth international footballers
Bosnia and Herzegovina footballers
Association football defenders
English Football League players
Swiss Super League players
Swiss Challenge League players
3. Liga players
Arsenal F.C. players
Barnet F.C. players
Grasshopper Club Zürich players
FC Winterthur players
FC Wohlen players
FC Viktoria Köln players
Yverdon-Sport FC players
People from Brugg
Expatriate footballers in England
Expatriate footballers in Germany
Bosnia and Herzegovina expatriate sportspeople in England
Bosnia and Herzegovina expatriate sportspeople in Germany
Sportspeople from Aargau